Al Wenglikowski (born August 3, 1960) is a former American football linebacker. He played for the Buffalo Bills in 1984 and 1987.

References

1960 births
Living people
American football linebackers
Pittsburgh Panthers football players
Buffalo Bills players